Chile participated at the 2003 Pan American Games, held in Santo Domingo, Dominican Republic, from 1 to 17 August 2003.

Medalists

Results by event

Athletics

Track

Road

Field

Heptathlon

Swimming

Men's competitions

Women's competitions

Tennis

Men

Triathlon

See also
Chile at the 2004 Summer Olympics

References

Nations at the 2003 Pan American Games
Pan American Games
2003